Shah Valeh (also Romanized as Shāh Valeh, Shāh Valī, Shāhveleh, and Shāh Waleh; also known as Shāh Valad) is a village in Japelaq-e Gharbi Rural District, Japelaq District, Azna County, Lorestan Province, Iran. At the 2006 census, its population was 128, in 35 families.

References 

Towns and villages in Azna County